Nyabushozi County is the south constituency of western Region, Ugandas district of Kiruhura. This is where Lake Mburo National Park is found. It borders with Isingiro in the south and Mbarara to the south-west The Area is commonly known for being Cattle keeping area characterised and highly occupied by indigenous Ankole Sanga Cattle.

it is represented by Hon Wilson Kajwengye in the Parliament of Uganda.

References

Populated places in Western Region, Uganda
Kiruhura District